Thushara is a 2009 Sri Lankan Sinhala romantic film directed and produced by Sahan Wijesinghe for Saga Films. The film is a remake of Yasapalitha Nanayakkara's yesteryear movie Thushara in 1973.  It stars Saliya Sathyajith and Shalika Edirisinghe in lead roles along with Buddhika Rambukwella and Piumi Purasinghe. Music composed by Sarath de Alwis. It is the 1130th Sri Lankan film in the Sinhala cinema.

Plot
Sampath, Thushara and Keerthi are batchmates. Sonia is a relation of Sampath. Thushara is Sampath's girl friend at campus. Sonia and Thushara are friends. Sonia's father and Sampath's mother tries to make them marry but Sampath doesn't have any romantic feelings for Sonia. So Sonia and specially her father does things to put apart Thushara and Sampath. One is to tell fake things to Thushara's father about Sampath and make him disappointed. Another one is attacking Sampath at a club. The story goes on as Sampath persists those challenges and finally marries Thushara and at the end of the film we get the feeling that Sonia and Keerthi find love between them too.

Cast
 Saliya Sathyajith as Sampath
 Shalika Edirisinghe as Thushara
 Buddhika Rambukwella as Keerthi
 Piumi Purasinghe as Soniya
 Sahan Wijesinghe as Vijay
 Robin Fernando as Thushara's father
 Rex Kodippili as Sonia's father
 Sonia Disa as Sampath's mother
 Chitra Wakishta as Wilson's fiancée's mother
 Anju Bandara Rajaguru
 Chathura Perera as Wilson
 Chitra Wakishta

Soundtrack

References

2009 films
2000s Sinhala-language films
Remakes of Sri Lankan films